Two Horizons is the fifth solo album by Irish singer Moya Brennan. It is her first full-length release under the name Moya Brennan, as opposed to Máire Brennan. The album was predominantly recorded in her home studio in Dublin and was nominated for a Grammy award. The album was recorded between 2002–2003 and first became available on 23 October 2003. It is also Brennan's first non-Christian album since her 1993 recording Misty Eyed Adventures. It is the most successful of her solo albums to date and the second to be Grammy-nominated.

The album marks a change of direction in production, arrangement and style for Brennan in terms of her solo career, featuring no other vocalists but herself. The album features Irish fiddle player Máire Breatnach among others. The album also features much of Brennan's current live band.

Recordings were made in various studios in London, England and Dublin, Ireland during 2003:

The River (studio), London
Pulse Recording Studios, Dublin, Ireland
Mo Studios, Dublin, Ireland

Track listing

All songs written by Moya Brennan & composed by Moya Brennan and Ross Cullum, except where noted:

"Show Me"  – 4:57
"Bright Star"  – 4:15
"Change My World"  – 3:45 (Brennan, Cullum, Fionan DeBarra, Feargal Murray)
"Bí Liom"  – 4:32
"Is It Now [Theme]"  – 0:38
"Falling"  – 4:19 (Brennan, Cullum, DeBarra, Murray)
"Tara"  – 5:02
"Ancient Town"  – 3:45
"Show Me [Theme]"  – 1:08
"Sailing Away"  – 3:05 (Brennan, Cullum, DeBarra)
"River"  – 4:08
"Is It Now"  – 3:50
"Mothers of the Desert"  – 3:53 (Brennan, Cullum, Murray)
"Harpsong"  – 3:23
"Two Horizons"  – 4:29
Bonus track
"Show Me (Jakatta mix)"  – 6:10
Hidden track
 Enhanced content  – 15:00 (lists as fifteen minutes in some computer audio players)

Personnel

Band
Moya Brennan – Vocals, Harp, Keyboards
Ross Cullum – Guitars, Percussion, Keyboards
Sinéad Madden – Fiddle
Fionán deBarra – Guitar, Bouzouki
Tiarán Ó Duinnchinn – Uillean Pipes, Whistles
Paul Byrne – Drums, Percussion
Ewan Cowley – Mandolin
Máire Breatnach – Fiddle, Violin
Éamonn deBarra – Flute
Robbie McIntosh – Guitars
Anthony Drennan – Guitars
Keith Duffy – Bass
Troy Donockley – Whistles
Nigel Eaton – Hurdy-gurdy
Bob Love – Fiddle
Brendan Monaghan – Bodhran, Lambeg drum
Sandy McLelland – Drums (on Mothers of the Desert)
Chris Hughes – Rhythm programming (on Mothers of the Desert)
Martin Carthy – Guitar (on Change My World, Bí Liom)

Additional musicians
String Quartet
 Úna Ní Chanainn – Cello
 Brona Cahill – Violin
 Tommy Kane – Viola
 Máire Breatnach – Violin, Viola
String Arrangement – by Feargal Murray, Ross Cullum

Track listing
"Show Me"  – 4:57
"Bright Star"  – 4:15
"Change My World"  – 3:45
"Bí Liom"  – 4:32
"Is It Now [Theme]"  – 0:38
"Falling"  – 4:19
"Tara"  – 5:02
"Ancient Town"  – 3:45
"Show Me [Theme]"  – 1:08
"Sailing Away"  – 3:05
"River"  – 4:08
"Is It Now"  – 3:50
"Mothers of the Desert"  – 3:53
"Harpsong"  – 3:23
"Two Horizons"  – 4:29
Bonus track
"Show Me (jakatta mix)"  – 6:10
Hidden track
 Enhanced content  – 15:00 (lists as fifteen minutes in some computer audio players)

Singles

Commercial singles
"Show Me"

Promotional singles
"Show Me"
"Tara"

Release details
2003, UK, Universal 980 106-8, Release Date 22 September 2003, CD
2003, UK, Universal Moya AL23, Release Date 22 September 2003, Cassette
2003, USA, Decca B0001915-12, Release Date 22 September 2003, CD
2003, Japan, Universal UICO-1054, Release Date ? September 2003, CD
2003, UK, Universal 980 107-0, Release Date ? September, Super Audio CD

Notes

External links
 This album at Northern Skyline

Moya Brennan albums
2003 albums
Universal Records albums